The San Benedetto Tennis Cup is a professional tennis tournament played on outdoor red clay courts. It is currently part of the Association of Tennis Professionals (ATP) Challenger Tour. It is held annually at the Circolo Tennis Maggioni in San Benedetto del Tronto, Italy, since 2001.

Past finals

Singles

Doubles

External links
Official website
ITF Search